Charles Gidley Wheeler (1938–2010), also known as Charles Gidley, was a television screenwriter and historical novelist whose work has been acclaimed in Publishers Weekly, The Washington Post, Kirkus Reviews, and The New York Times.

Wheeler was educated at Byron House, University College School, London and Durham University, where he read Philosophy. He served in the Royal Navy from 1954 to 1979.  His best known work is The Raging of the Sea.

Works

Blackwood's Magazine
Gem of the Orient (August 1965)
Forgotten Island (May 1966)
Night Patrol (August 1967)
Cassino Anniversary (March 1969)
New Gold (January 1970)
Scouse, Sage and Sultan (August 1973)
Padre Batista's Revolution (January 1975

Television drama
Warship (five episodes: All of One Company, Under the Surface, Man in Reserve, Countercharge, Jack Fell Down) BBC Television
Wings (two episodes: Zeppelin, No Medals) BBC Television
Thundercloud (four episodes: Pigs Might Fly, 14 Jun 79, Don't Go Near The Water, 19 Jul 79, Bats in the Belfry, 9 Aug 79, Goodbye Mr Tortoise, 18 Dec 79.) Yorkshire Television
The Sandbaggers (two episodes: My Name is Anna Wiseman, Who Needs Enemies?) Yorkshire Television

Novels
The River Running By (First published 1981) Publishing history: UK: Deutsch/Fontana; US: St. Martin's Press; Argentina (South American Spanish): Editores Emece under title El Rio que Pasa)
The Raging of the Sea (First published 1984) Publishing history: UK: Deutsch/Fontana; US: Viking Press
The Believer (First published 1985) Publishing history: UK: Deutsch/Fontana
Armada (First published 1987) Publishing history: UK: Weidenfeld & Nicolson/Fontana; US: Viking Press; Brazil (Brazilian): Globo
The Fighting Spirit (First published 1989) Publishing history: UK: Collins/Fontana
The Crying of the Wind (First published 1992) Publishing history: UK: HarperCollins/Fontana

Notes

References

 Naval Review review of Jannaway's Mutiny (August 2005) on Naval Review website (Available only to members of the Naval Review)
 Hampshire Chronicle review of The Crying of the Wind (March 6, 1992)
 Private Eye review of The Crying of the Wind (March 14, 1992)

External links 
 
 Review of Jannaway's Mutiny in Midwest Book Review

English writers
1938 births
People educated at Byron House School
People educated at University College School
2010 deaths
Alumni of Durham University